The large moth family Crambidae contains the following genera beginning with "U":

References 

 U
Crambid